Mathieu Carol Garon (born January 9, 1978) is a Canadian former professional ice hockey goaltender. He played in the National Hockey League (NHL) for the Los Angeles Kings, Edmonton Oilers, Montreal Canadiens, Pittsburgh Penguins, Columbus Blue Jackets, and Tampa Bay Lightning between 2000 and 2013. 

He was drafted 44th overall by the Montreal Canadiens in the 1996 NHL Entry Draft, and was also a member of the 2009 Stanley Cup-winning Pittsburgh Penguins, serving as the backup to Marc-Andre Fleury.

Playing career

As a youth, Garon played in the 1991 Quebec International Pee-Wee Hockey Tournament with a minor ice hockey team from Rimouski, Quebec.

Garon spent his junior career with the Victoriaville Tigres of the Quebec Major Junior Hockey League (QMJHL). In three seasons with the Tigres, Garon posted a 74–63–5 record. At the conclusion of the 1997–98 season, the last of his junior career, he won the Jacques Plante Memorial Trophy as the best goaltender in the QMJHL and was named to the QMJHL First All-Star Team. He was also named CHL Goaltender of the Year as the top goaltender in Canadian major junior hockey and to the CHL First All-Star team. Garon also played for Canada at the 1998 World Junior Championships in Finland when Canada finished eighth.

After being drafted by the Canadiens in the second round in 1996, Garon spent the first five seasons of his professional career playing primarily with the Canadiens' American Hockey League (AHL) affiliates, which included the Fredericton Canadiens, the Quebec Citadelles and the Hamilton Bulldogs. He was called up for brief stints with the Canadiens before he won the full-time back-up job with the team for the 2003–04 season. Garon played 19 games behind José Théodore that season, posting an 8–6–2 record, a 2.27 goals against average (GAA) and .921 save percentage.

In the summer of 2004, Garon was traded (along with a third-round draft pick) to the Los Angeles Kings for Radek Bonk and Cristobal Huet. During the 2004–05 NHL lockout, Garon played with the Kings' AHL affiliate, the Manchester Monarchs, posting an impressive 32–14–4 record, 2.12 GAA, .927 save percentage, and eight shutouts. This helped earn him the starting job with the Kings when NHL play resumed for the 2005–06 season. However, Garon struggled in the number one role and was relegated to backup for the 2006–07 season.

Following the 2006–07 season, Garon became an unrestricted free agent and on July 3, 2007, he signed a two-year, $2.2 million contract with the Edmonton Oilers. Garon split time with incumbent starter Dwayne Roloson and his strong play earned him 47 appearances through which he posted a 2.66 GAA, .913 save percentage, and four shutouts. Despite his efforts, the Oilers failed to qualify for the playoffs. However, Garon earned praise for going a perfect 10–0 in shootouts that season, stopping a remarkable 30 of 32 shot attempts in the process.

Garon was named to Canada's roster for the 2008 IIHF World Championship in Quebec City and Halifax, although he did not receive any playing time behind Cam Ward and Pascal Leclaire as Canada won the silver medal.

Roloson reemerged as Edmonton's undisputed starter in 2008–09 and on January 17, 2009, Garon was traded to the Pittsburgh Penguins in exchange for Ryan Stone, Dany Sabourin, and the Penguins' fourth-round pick in the 2011 NHL Entry Draft. Garon saw limited action behind starter Marc-André Fleury, who backstopped the Penguins to their third Stanley Cup championship, defeating the Detroit Red Wings in a seven-game rematch of the previous year's final. Garon's only appearance in the playoffs came in game five of the finals in relief of Fleury.

On July 1, 2009, Garon again became an unrestricted free agent and signed a two-year contract with the Columbus Blue Jackets worth $1.2 million per season. In his first season with the Blue Jackets, he appeared in 35 games and posted a 12–9–6 record backing-up Steve Mason, the winner of the 2009 Calder Memorial Trophy.

On July 1, 2011, Garon signed a two-year, $2.6 million contract with the Tampa Bay Lightning. This was the second team in which  Garon and Roloson were teammates (after Edmonton).

After his contract expired, due to lack of interest from NHL teams, Garon pursued a career in the Kontinental Hockey League (KHL), signing with Avangard Omsk.

Career statistics

Regular season and playoffs

International

References

External links
 

1978 births
Living people
Avangard Omsk players
Canadian expatriate ice hockey players in Russia
Canadian ice hockey goaltenders
Columbus Blue Jackets players
Edmonton Oilers players
Fredericton Canadiens players
Hamilton Bulldogs (AHL) players
Ice hockey people from Quebec
Los Angeles Kings players
Manchester Monarchs (AHL) players
Montreal Canadiens draft picks
Montreal Canadiens players
People from Gaspésie–Îles-de-la-Madeleine
Pittsburgh Penguins players
Quebec Citadelles players
Stanley Cup champions
Tampa Bay Lightning players
Victoriaville Tigres players